Bailando! is a special promotional release by pop singer Gloria Estefan.

Released in 1998, Bailando! was sold only in Target department stores as a promotion for the gloria! album. A complementary English-language release, Party Time!, was released at the same time, again sold only at Target.

There is only one track on the CD and Cassette: "The Bailando Megamix", a 22-minute megamix of seven of Gloria's biggest Latin hits up to that point, including one song in English-Language (Higher). Several of the included songs were remixed in a house or techno style. The medley was also included in the Cuba Libre single released in Europe and Spain.

Megamix Song Sequence
 "Mi Tierra"
 "Abriendo Puertas"
 "Oye Mi Canto"
 "Montuno"
 "Tradición"
 "Higher"
 "Tres Deseos"

Production Credits
Producer: Pablo Flores for Estefan Enterprises Inc.
Remix and additional production by Pablo Flores.
Keyboards and programming by Lester Mendez.
Mixed by Javier Garza.

References

Gloria Estefan EPs
Gloria Estefan songs
1998 EPs